Tel-Hai College is a college located in Tel Hai in northern Israel, near  Kibbutz Kfar Giladi and north of Kiryat Shmona.

The college offers academic and continuing education programs for approximately 4,500 students, 70 percent of whom come from outside the Galilee. Minorities comprise about 10 percent of the student body. The college offers degrees in life sciences, social sciences, computer science, and the humanities.

The college sees itself as "an agent of social and economic development in the highly strategic Upper Galilee region." Because of its location at the country's farthest northern border, Tel Hai's mandate extends beyond the area of education to include opportunities for individual and community development and closing social and economic rifts.

Many biology science professors who teach at Tel Hai have research groups at MIGAL where many students also develop their bachelor or master projects.

Center for Learning Disabilities

In 1995, Tel Hai College opened the Center for Learning Disabled Students, the first of its kind in Israel. The center enables students with learning disabilities to thrive and excel in a competitive academic environment and realize their individual potential. The center caters to students with dyslexia (difficulties in organizing and processing written materials), dysgraphia (difficulty with written expression), foreign language learning and many other types of learning disorders. Sophisticated diagnostic tests are used to pinpoint areas of difficulty, so that maximum time and energy can be spent on learning how to overcome them.

See also
List of universities and colleges in Israel

References

External links
The Tel-Hai College Website (English Version)
United Jewish Communities' January 2004 OEP Project of the Month

Colleges in Israel